Gurja Khani  is a village development committee in Myagdi District in the Dhaulagiri Zone of western-central Nepal. At the time of the 1991 Nepal census it had a population of 874 people living in 160 individual households. It is one of the many villages in Myadgi district predominantly inhabited by Chhantyal people.

References

External links
UN map of the municipalities of Myagdi District

Populated places in Myagdi District